David Parfitt (born 8 July 1958) is an English film producer, actor, and co-founder of Trademark Films. He won the Academy Award for Best Picture at the 71st Academy Awards for Shakespeare in Love (1998).

Early life
Parfitt was born in Sunderland and educated at the Barbara Speake Stage School, an independent school in London.

Career
He began his stage career with the Sunderland Empire Theatre Society in 1969 and later gained work on television, including playing Peter Harrison in the sitcoms ...And Mother Makes Three  (1971–1973) and its sequel ...And Mother Makes Five (1974–1976) and appearing in Love in a Cold Climate (1980). In the BBC Radio 4 serial The Archers, he was the first actor in the role of Tim Beecham, an old friend of Nigel Pargetter.

Work as a producer
Parfitt gave up acting in the late 1980s to concentrate on production. He co-founded the Renaissance Theatre Company with Kenneth Branagh in 1987, and was associate producer of Renaissance Film's first production, Henry V in 1989. Since then he has produced and associate-produced many British films, including Peter's Friends, Swan Song (1992), Much Ado About Nothing (1993), Mary Shelley's Frankenstein, Twelfth Night (1996), The Wings of the Dove (1997), Gangs of New York (Production Consultant), I Capture the Castle, Chasing Liberty, A Bunch of Amateurs, My Week with Marilyn, Loving Vincent and Red Joan. Shakespeare in Love won the BAFTA Award for Best Film as well as the Academy Award and The Madness of King George won the BAFTA Award for Outstanding British Film in 1996.

He produced TV adaptations of Parade's End in 2012 and The Wipers Times in 2013 for the BBC, both of which were nominated for British Academy Television Awards. His company has since produced The Wipers Times in theatres in the West End and throughout the UK.

He also produced The Father (2020) and received a nomination for the Academy Award for Best Picture, as well as nominations for Best Film and Outstanding British Film at the BAFTA Film Awards.

Other activities
He was Chairman of the British Academy of Film and Television Arts (BAFTA) from 2008 to 2010 and was Chair of Film London from 2010 to 2017. Since 2018 he has been a governor of Dulwich College, where he was formerly a parent.

Personal life
He was awarded an Honorary Doctorate of Arts from the University of Sunderland in 1999. He lives in Brixton with his wife Liz and their three sons, Bill, Thomas and Max.

He is a supporter of Sunderland AFC.

Filmography
He was a producer in all films unless otherwise noted.

Film

As an actor

Miscellaneous crew

Thanks

Television

As an actor

References

External links 

Trademark Films

People from Sunderland
Male actors from Tyne and Wear
English male television actors
English film producers
Filmmakers who won the Best Film BAFTA Award
Golden Globe Award-winning producers
Producers who won the Best Picture Academy Award
1958 births
Living people
People educated at Barbara Speake Stage School